S.I.D.E.S. is the second studio album by German-Canadian singer Alice Merton, released on 17 June 2022 through Paper Planes and Mom + Pop Music.

Track listing

Charts

References

Alice Merton albums